What Should I Do? is a short-lived educational series focusing on moral topics originally produced in animation during the late 1960s and early 1970s by The Walt Disney Company's educational media division. Additional live-action entries were produced in 1992. What Should I Do? films were featured in some episodes of Donald Duck Presents.

Films
1969
The Fight (updated in 1992)
The Game (updated in 1992)

1970
The New Girl
The Lunch Money
The Project

1992 (live-action)
The Baseball Cards
The Lunch Group
The Mural
The Play

See also
Upjohn's Triangle of Health

Notes

Film series introduced in 1969
Animated film series
Disney direct-to-video animated films
Disney short film series